The Air Fleet of the UPR was the air force of the Ukrainian People's Republic in 1917–1921.

Aircraft

Fighters
Morane-Saulnier Type Nm (3)
Sikorsky S-16
Nieuport 11 C.1 Bebe
Nieuport 17 (3)
Nieuport 21 (2)
Nieuport 23 (7)
Nieuport 27
SPAD S.VII (2)
Sopwith Camel F.1
Sopwith 1-1/2 Strutter (1)
Vickers FB.19 Bullet
Fokker D.VII

Reconnaissance
Anatra D Anade
Anatra DSS Anasal
Lloyd C.V

Bombers
Voisin III LA S (6)
Maurice Farman MF.11 Shorthorn (1)
Zeppelin-Staaken R.XIVa (1)
Sikorsky Ilja Muromets S-14 G-1

See also
Air Fleet of the Revolutionary Insurgent Army of Ukraine
Ukrainian People's Army
Ukrainian Galician Army

References

External links

Military history of Ukraine
Military units and formations of Ukraine
Disbanded air forces
Military units and formations established in 1917
Military units and formations disestablished in 1921
Ukrainian People's Republic